John Healy (23 June 1851 – 17 May 1916) was an Australian cricketer. He played two first-class cricket matches, including one for Victoria.

References

External links
 

1851 births
1916 deaths
Australian cricketers
Victoria cricketers
Cricketers from South Australia
People from Burra, South Australia